The Chinese broad-headed pond turtle (Mauremys megalocephala) is a species of turtle in the family Geoemydidae.
It is endemic to China.

References

Chinemys
Reptiles of China
Endangered biota of Asia
Reptiles described in 1934
Taxonomy articles created by Polbot
Taxobox binomials not recognized by IUCN